Alfonso Torreggiani (1682–1764) was an Italian architect of the Rococo period, principally associated with Bologna.

Life

Torregiani was born in Budrio. An apprentice of Giuseppe Antonio Torri, he became intensely active in the city of Bologna working on the design of churches and private buildings and as a consultant on the organisation and reconstruction of existing buildings: for example, the Church of Sant'Ignazio, 1726; the interior of the Church of La Maddalena, 1735; the Palazzo Torfanini (then property of the Princes of Este) in the Via Galliera, 1735; continued the construction of the Palazzo Aldrovandi in 1741, the west front of the cathedral, 1744–52, and the high altar in the Basilica of San Domenico. 

Torreggiani was named prince of the Accademia Clementina, and had the patronage of Cardinale Pompeo Aldrovandi and Pope Benedict XIV (Lambertini). For the former he completed a Chapel in the Basilica of San Petronio. Among his main collaborators in Bologna were the painter Vittorio Bigari (1692-1776) and the sculptor Angelo Piò (1690-1770).

His principal clients, besides the nobility and the rising bourgeoisie, were the Bolognese Curia and the Society of Jesus, for whom he built the Novitiate of Sant'Ignazio, now the Pinacoteca Nazionale, of which the Church of Sant' Ignazio (above) was originally part. In addition, the Jesuits of Mantua entrusted to Torreggiani the project of the Palazzo degli Studi (1763). Also in Mantua, from 1756, he planned the new Palazzo Cavriani which was built after the collapse of the earlier residence of the ancient Mantuan family. He also designed the Jesuit College in Rimini, now the City Museum.

Sources
 Website of the Direzione Regionale per i Beni Culturali e Paesagistici della Emilia-Romagna: Alfonso Torreggiani architetto. Edifici civili a Bologna 
 Website of the Direzione Regionale per i Beni Culturali e Paesagistici della Emilia-Romagna: Alfonso Torreggiani architetto. Edifici religiosi a Bologna

Bibliography
 Foratti, A., 1935: Alfonso Torreggiani (1682-1764), in "Bologna" n. 5, XIII, Bologna 1935
 Matteucci, A.M., 1969: Carlo Francesco Dotti e l'architettura bolognese del Settecento. Bologna
 Matteucci, A.M., 1988: Alfonso Torreggiani architetto dei Gesuiti, in G.P. Brizzi (ed. A.M. Matteucci): Dall'isola Alla Città. I Gesuiti a Bologna. Bologna
 Matteucci, A.M., 1988: L'architettura del Settecento, in "Storia dell'Arte Italiana". Turin

1682 births
1764 deaths
18th-century Italian architects
People from the Province of Bologna
Italian ecclesiastical architects
Architects from Bologna